Patrick Rosal is a Filipino American poet and essayist.

Writing 
Rosal is the author of four books of poetry: Brooklyn Antediluvian, Boneshepherds, My American Kundiman, and Uprock Headspin Scramble and Dive, all from Persea Books. His poems and essays have been published widely in journals and anthologies including The New York Times, Tin House, Drunken Boat, Poetry, New England Review, American Poetry Review, Harvard Review, Grantland, Brevity, Breakbeat Poets, and The Best American Poetry. He is co-founding editor of Some Call It Ballin’, a literary sports magazine.

Career 
Rosal received his MFA in creative writing from Sarah Lawrence College. In 2009, he was awarded a Fulbright Fellowship to the Philippines. He has taught at Sarah Lawrence College, the University of Texas, Austin, Bloomfield College, and is currently an associate professor of creative writing at Rutgers University-Camden.

Awards 
 2007 - Global Filipino Literary Award for My American Kundiman
 2008 - Association for Asian American Studies Poetry/Prose Award for My American Kundiman
 2011 - National Book Critics Circle Small Press Highlight for Boneshepherds
 2017 - Guggenheim Fellowship
 2017 - Lenore Marshall Poetry Prize for Brooklyn Antediluvian
 2017 - Finalist for the Kingsley Tufts Poetry Award for Brooklyn Antediluvian
 2018 - National Endowment for the Arts Creative Writing Fellowship
 2022 - William Carlos Williams Award

Bibliography

Books 
 Brooklyn Antediluvian (Persea Books, 2016) , 
 Boneshepherds (Persea Books, 2011) , 
 My American Kundiman (Persea Books, 2006) , 
 Uprock Headspin Scramble and Dive (Persea Books, 2003) , 
 The Last Thing: New & Selected Poems (Persea Books, 2021) ,

References 

Year of birth missing (living people)
Living people
Filipino male poets
Filipino male writers
Sarah Lawrence College alumni
Sarah Lawrence College faculty
Rutgers University–Camden faculty
University of Texas at Austin faculty